The 2017 Santosh Trophy Final was the 71st final of Santosh Trophy, the football competition contested by regional State associations and government institutions under the All India Football Federation. It was contested between Goa and West Bengal on 26 March 2017 at the GMC Stadium in Bambolim. Bengal beat Goa 1–0 in extra time, with the only goal being scored by Manvir Singh.

Background
West Bengal went into the final with a record of 31 wins from 41 Santosh Trophy finals and Goa with five out of eleven, with the two teams sharing the trophy in 1982–83. They met six time previously in the final, and Bengal had won five. Goa, however, won their last meeting, in 2008–09. Bengal had defeated Goa the last time the latter hosted the competition, in 1995–96.

Details

Statistics

References

March 2017 sports events in Asia
2016–17 Santosh Trophy
Santosh Trophy finals